Schlossspiele Kobersdorf is a theatre in Austria.

Theatres in Austria